Codehunters is a 2006 short film directed and written by Ben Hibon, animated by Axis Animation, and music by Joris de Man. It was commissioned by MTV Asia and shown at the MTV Music Awards, it has been viewed over 400 million times.

Plot

Codehunters tells the story of four heroes: Shen, Lawan, Zom and Nhi as they join forces to battle corrupt gangs, dirty paycops, rampaging monsters and the tyrannical Khann in the crumbling port city of Lhek. Codehunters is set in the not too distant future and uses a mix of eastern anime & western animation techniques.

Style

A variety of techniques were used to achieve the appearance of Hibon's 2D drawings. The use of cel shading, 2D textures to create a drawing appearance, and character outlines to keep true the pencils of the artwork.

Borderlands

Gearbox Software's Borderlands is claimed to be inspired by the film. Kotaku reported on the subject, debating how much inspiration was actually taken. Ben Hibon said he was in talks to work on the project, but contact ceased:

When Kotaku inquired into the similarities between Borderlands and Codehunters, Randy Pitchford responded, "artists and designers at Gearbox were inspired and influenced by it." Earlier versions of Borderlands used a more generic science fiction style before being revamped to the cel-shaded style it was published with.

Reception

The film has received positive reception with praise going towards the artstyle, animation, and music.

References

2006 short films
2006 films
British animated short films
2000s British films